Judge Sheppard may refer to

John Levi Sheppard (1852–1902), judge of the Texas Fifth Judicial District
William Bostwick Sheppard (1860–1934), judge of the United States District Court for the Northern District of Florida

See also
Judge Shepherd (disambiguation)
Justice Shepard (disambiguation)